Milan Emil Vooletich Jr. (October 9, 1941 – October 26, 2006) was an American football player and coach.  He played football at Geneva College in the mid-1960s and later had a 32-year career as a football coach including eight years as an assistant coach under Bo Schembechler at the University of Michigan, five years as an assistant coach under Hayden Fry at the University of Iowa and stints as the defensive coordinator at Rice University and Navy.

Biography

Early years
Vooletich was a native of Pittsburgh, Pennsylvania and a graduate of Pittsburgh's Carrick High School.  Vooletich attended Geneva College in Beaver Falls, Pennsylvania where he played football for the Geneva Golden Tornadoes football team from 1962 to 1965.

Sandusky High School
After graduating from Geneva College in 1964, Vooletich began coaching high school football at Sandusky High School in Sandusky, Ohio.  Vooletich also taught social studies at Sandusky High School. During Vooletich's years at Sandusky, he served under head coaches Earle Bruce, Bob Seaman and Bob Reublin.  The 1966 Sandusky Blue Streaks posted a perfect 10–0 record and claimed the Ohio state championship.  While coaching at Sandusky, Vooletich developed a close relationship with defensive standout, Thom Darden.  When Darden became an All-American at Michigan, he paid tribute to Vooletich for helping him become a top defensive player.  Vooletich later said of Darden: "Thom and I came into the Sandusky High football program in 1964. He is a whole individual, warm person, concerned, and means a little extra to me and my family."

Assistant to Bill Mallory at Miami and Colorado
In 1969, Sandusky High School graduate, Bill Mallory, was hired to replace Bo Schembechler as the head football coach at Miami University in Oxford, Ohio.  Mallory asked Vooletich and Sandusky head coach Bob Reublin to join him at Miami.  Vooletich was a graduate assistant in 1969 and was promoted to full-time varsity football staff member in 1970.  Vooletich also received his master's degree in education administration from Miami University in 1970.  He served on Mallory's staff at Miami for five seasons from 1969 to 1973.  In 1974, Mallory left Miami to take the head coaching position at Colorado, and Vooletich and Rebulin moved to Colorado with Mallory.  Vooletich was Colorado's defensive backs coach for four years from 1974 to 1977.

University of Michigan
In 1978, Vooletich accepted a position as an assistant coach under Bo Schembechler at the University of Michigan.  Vooletich remained a coach at Michigan for eight years under Schembechler.  While at Michigan, Vooletich helped coached several strong defensive units, including the 1985 team that allowed 98 points in 12 games (8.16 points per game), the 1978 team that allowed 105 points in 12 games (8.75 points per game) and the 1980 team that allowed 129 points in 12 games (10.75 points per game).

Defensive coordinator at Rice and Navy
In 1986, Vooletich left Michigan to become the defensive coordinator at Rice University.

In 1987, Vooletich's former co-assistant at Michigan, Elliot Uzelac, was hired as the head coach at the United States Naval Academy.  Uzelac asked Vooletich to join him as the defensive coordinator at Navy, and Vooletich agreed.  Vooletich remained at Navy as the defensive coordinator for three seasons from 1987 to 1989.  While serving as the defensive coordinator for Navy in 1987, Vooletich told The Washington Post''', "Football is a very simple game.  You work within the structure of the offense and the defense and carry out your assignments, good things are going to happen."

University of Iowa
In 1990, Vooletich was hired by the University of Iowa as the defensive ends coach under Hayden Fry.  Vooletich was credited by Sports Illustrated'' in 1990 with "a good deal of the credit" in leading the Iowa Hawkeyes to the 1990 Big Ten championship.  Vooletich coached the defensive ends at Iowa from 1990 to 1995, and Iowa played in four bowl games during his years there, including the 1991 Rose Bowl.

In January 1996, Iowa coach Hayden Fry told reporters that he had hired a new defensive coordinator and added, "I don't anticipate Milan being back. Un-unh."  The following day, Vooletich told reporters he wanted to stay at Iowa, but that seemed unlikely based on Fry's comment.  Vooletich said he did not know what was going on: "I'll be damned if I know.  He might think I'm looking for a job, but I'm not.  I'm going to sit down and talk with him and find out what the hell is going on. ... This has just devastated me."  Several days later, Vooletich announced his resignation saying, "I've enjoyed my tenure at Iowa" and adding, "I'll leave Iowa with nothing but good memories."

University of Kentucky
Vooletich's final coaching position was in 1996 as the linebackers coach at the University of Kentucky under Bill Curry.

Later years and family
Vooletich was married for 42 years to Rosemary Loughman Vooletich.  They had two children, Brian and Dan, both of whom played college football.  Their older son, Dan Vooletich, played for the University of North Carolina and later went into coaching.  Their younger son, Brian Vooletich, played at North Carolina and later at Michigan State University.  In 1996, Vooletich coached against his son, Brian, when Iowa played against Michigan State.  Vooletich said at the time, "I just want to watch the kid play.  He's a heck of a young man. His mother has done a great job of raising him."

After retiring from coaching, Vooletich lived in Missouri City, Texas.  He died in San Antonio, Texas in October 2006 at age 65.

References

1941 births
2006 deaths
Colorado Buffaloes football coaches
Geneva Golden Tornadoes football players
Iowa Hawkeyes football coaches
Kentucky Wildcats football coaches
Miami RedHawks football coaches
Michigan Wolverines football coaches
Navy Midshipmen football coaches
Rice Owls football coaches
High school football coaches in Ohio